The River Sessions is a live album by the English rock band Magnum, recorded on 28 May 1985 at The Mayfair, Glasgow, Scotland, by Radio Clyde and released in 2004.

Track listing

Personnel
Tony Clarkin — guitar
Bob Catley — vocals
Wally Lowe — bass guitar
Mark Stanway — keyboards
Mickey Barker — drums

References

External links
 www.magnumonline.co.uk — Official Magnum site

Albums produced by Tony Clarkin
Magnum (band) live albums
2004 live albums